Rob Lewis is a South Australian marine scientist and retired senior civil servant. He discovered the first known upwelling system in southern Australia and was professionally involved in fisheries and aquaculture management for 38 years. He was head of South Australian Research and Development Institute (SARDI) from 1992 to 2010.

Career 
Lewis joined South Australia's Department of Fisheries as a research officer in 1973, where he worked in support of the rock lobster fishery. By 1987 he was working in a research management capacity, balancing fisheries, aquaculture and marine conservation interests. He joined SARDI in 1992, and was appointed Executive Director in 1993. There he was responsible for guiding SARDI in its development as a "model state research agency" supporting the interests of South Australia's primary industries. He promoted collaboration between Government, private sector interests and academic institutions and helped secure South Australia's role in the establishment of Collaborative Research Centres (CRCs) for Aquaculture, Finfish, Molecular Plant Breeding and Seafood.

In 2002, Lewis named the growth of aquaculture, the development of plump and juicy cherries and research in soil-born diseases as highlights of the first ten years of SARDI.

Under Lewis' leadership, SARDI obtained the research vessel Ngerin , established the SA Aquatic Sciences Centre, refined plans for the Plant Research Centre and supported the development of the Lincoln Marine Science Centre. Lewis was "a major driver" in the establishment of the Marine Innovation South Australia initiative; a collaborative project involving SARDI Aquatic Sciences, Flinders University, the University of Adelaide, the South Australian Museum and the seafood industry with the goal of increasing the value of South Australia's seafood sector.

Lewis retired from SARDI in 2010 but continues to hold an honorary fellowship there. He went on to become the independent chair of the Fisheries and Aquaculture National Priorities Forum.

The South Australian Aquatic Biosecurity Centre, a collaboration between the University of Adelaide and SARDI opened in 2011. Lewis was involved in the project as the chair of Marine Innovation South Australia.

He is also a Fellow of the Australian Academy of Technological Sciences and Engineering.

He was awarded a Centenary Medal for services to marine sciences in 2003 and an Australian Honours Public Service Medal for services to primary industries research and development in 2011.

Lewis was appointed the inaugural President of Experiencing Marine Sanctuaries, a not-for-profit organisation which offers guided snorkeling tours within South Australian waters.

Board memberships 
Lewis has been a member of various management and advisory boards.

They include: 
 Premier's Science and Research Council
 South Australian Primary Industries Research and Development Board
 Australian Fisheries Management Authority
 Cooperative Research Centre for Molecular Plant Breeding
 Molecular Plant Breeding Pty Ltd
 Airborne Research Australia Pty Ltd
 The Crawford Fund SA Pty Ltd
 Australian Grain Technologies Pty Ltd
 Ausbiotech Pty Ltd (SA Division)
He had acted as Chair of the following entities:
 Australian Fisheries Management Authority Research Committee
 Commonwealth Fisheries Research Advisory Board
 Southern Bluefin Tuna Management Advisory Committee
 Australian Maritime College Council
 The A W Howard Memorial Trust Pty Ltd
 Adelaide and Mt Lofty Ranges Natural Resources Management Board

References 

Date of birth missing (living people)
Living people
Australian scientists
Australian oceanographers
Fellows of the Australian Academy of Technological Sciences and Engineering
Year of birth missing (living people)